Almaz Ilsurovich Askarov (born 21 January 1992) is a former Russian football midfielder.

Club career
He made his debut in the Russian Second Division for FC Rubin-2 Kazan on 5 August 2012 in a game against FC Volga Ulyanovsk.

He made his Russian Football National League debut for FC Gazovik Orenburg on 20 March 2016 in a game against FC Torpedo Armavir.

References

External links
 
Career summary by sportbox.ru

1992 births
People from Vyatskiye Polyany
Living people
Russian footballers
Association football midfielders
FC Rubin Kazan players
FC Orenburg players
Sportspeople from Kirov Oblast